Hungary has participated in the biennial classical music competition Eurovision Young Musicians six times since its debut in 1992, coming third in the 2014 contest, the country's best result to date.

Participation overview

See also
Hungary in the Eurovision Song Contest

References

External links
 Eurovision Young Musicians

Countries in the Eurovision Young Musicians